Damn! is a funk-rock band based in Lund, Sweden.  The four core members are joined on stage and on record by a collective of DJs and live musicians.  The group's first album "Natural Sounds" was recorded by the group as a trio and released on Lund Records in Sweden and LoveCat Music in North America.  The band members are also videographers and direct their own videos.  The band has toured Japan, Europe and North America.

Additionally, Damn! records and tours as the backup band for Swedish rapper Timbuktu.

Discography

Albums
Natural Sounds 1999
Youth Style  2004
Let's Zoom In  2008
The Unlocked Door  2009
Full Ära  2012

Compilations
Bossa Brava!  Volume 3  1998
The Very Best of Bossa Brava 2002
Latin Moderns Volume 1 2003
Latin Moderns Volume 2 2006
Latin Moderns Volume 3 2008
Lund Calling  2003

External links
  Official site
    DAMN! on MySpace*
[  DAMN! at AllMusic*]

Salsa music groups
Swedish musical groups
Musical collectives
Musical groups established in 1995